Leucanopsis perirrorata is a moth of the family Erebidae. It was described by Reich in 1935. It is found in Brazil.

References

perirrorata
Moths described in 1935